Nine-O-Nine was a Boeing B-17G-30-BO Flying Fortress heavy bomber, of the 323d Bombardment Squadron, 91st Bombardment Group, that completed 140 combat missions during World War II, believed to be the Eighth Air Force record for most missions, without loss to the crews that flew her. A different , painted to mimic the Nine-O-Nine, crashed at Bradley International Airport in Windsor Locks, Connecticut, in October 2019.

Service history 
The original aircraft, from a group of 30 B-17Gs manufactured by Boeing, was nicknamed after the last three digits of her serial number: 42-31909. Nine-O-Nine was added to the USAAF inventory on December 15, 1943, and flown overseas on February 5, 1944. After depot modifications, she was delivered to the 91st BG at RAF Bassingbourn, England, on February 24, 1944, as a replacement aircraft, one of the last B-17s received in factory-applied camouflage paint.

A former navigator of the 91st BG, Marion Havelaar, reported in his history of the group that Nine-O-Nine completed either 126 or 132 consecutive missions without aborting for mechanical reasons, also believed to be a record. M/Sgt. Rollin L. Davis, maintenance line chief of the bomber, received the Bronze Star for his role in achieving the record.

Her first bombing raid was on Augsburg, Germany, on February 25, 1944.  She made 18 bombing raids on Berlin.  In all she flew 1,129 hours and dropped 562,000lb (225 tonnes) of bombs. She had 21 engine changes, four wing panel changes, 15 main gas tank changes, and 18 changes of Tokyo tanks (long-range fuel tanks).

Nine-O-Nine returned to the United States after the war in Europe finished, on June 8, 1945. She was sent to the Reconstruction Finance Corporation facility at Kingman, Arizona on December 7, 1945, and eventually scrapped.

Collings Foundation Nine-O-Nine 
The Collings Foundation of Stow, Massachusetts, flew a different B-17G painted as a "tribute ship" to honor the original Nine-O-Nine at airshows and for "living history" flights, from 1986 until October 2019.

Military history

Flying Fortress 44-83575 (variant B-17G-85-DL) was built by the Douglas Aircraft Company in Long Beach, California, and was accepted by the military on April 7, 1945. Arriving too late for use in combat, 44-83575 operated as an Air-Sea Rescue aircraft until 1952, when she was reassigned to the Air Force Special Weapons Command for use as a specimen in weapons-effects testing. In this role, she was subjected to three nuclear explosions as part of Operation Tumbler–Snapper.

Civilian history
As 44-83575 was in relatively good condition, she was restored by Aircraft Specialties Company to airworthy condition for use as a water bomber over the course of ten years, entering service in 1977, until her operator's liquidation in 1985.

The Collings Foundation purchased the aircraft in January 1986, and her subsequent restoration to wartime configuration by Tom Reilly Vintage Aircraft won several awards. Carrying civil registration N93012, the plane was painted as Nine-O-Nine (including "231909" on the tail) and appeared at many airshows. It was featured in a 2019 episode of Museum Access, which included a detailed tour of its interior and video of the aircraft in flight; an "NL93012" placard can be seen on the instrument panel and "231909" on its tail.

Incidents 
On August 23, 1987, N93012 was caught by crosswinds during a landing at Beaver County Airport near Pittsburgh. Landing too far down the runway, the plane rolled off the end of runway, crashed through a fence and power pole, and came to rest down a  ravine. Landing gear, chin and ball turrets, bomb bay doors, Plexiglass nose, nacelles, wings, and fuselage all sustained damage. There were no fatalities, however three of the twelve people on board were injured. Repair work by volunteers and Air Heritage Aircraft Restoration Inc., supported by donations, brought N93012 back to airworthy condition.

On July 9, 1995, N93012 was again damaged, this time near Norfolk, Nebraska, when her landing gear would not fully deploy and she  was forced to make an emergency landing, causing some damage to the fuselage and at least one propeller.

On the morning of October 2, 2019, N93012 crashed at Bradley International Airport in Windsor Locks, Connecticut, while attempting to return shortly after takeoff. The aircraft was destroyed in the crash, and seven of the thirteen people on board were killed.

The National Transportation Safety Board (NTSB) launched an investigation, and in April 2021 released a report citing pilot error as the likely cause, with inadequate maintenance as a contributing factor.

References

External links

 Spherical panoramas over, under, around and through the Collings Foundation B-17G, Nine-O-Nine
 Boeing B-17 Flying Fortress on Jay Leno's Garage via YouTube
 News report (WTAE-TV) of August 1987 incident via YouTube

Individual aircraft of World War II
Boeing B-17 Flying Fortress